The following is a list of people executed by the U.S. state of North Dakota from 1885 to 1905.

Capital punishment was abolished in North Dakota in 1973. Only 8 people were ever executed in North Dakota, all via hanging.

See also 
 Capital punishment in North Dakota
 Capital punishment in the United States

References

 
People executed
North Dakota
executed